Hypochaeris chillensis (sometimes spelled Hypochoeris) also known as Brazilian cat's ear is a species of flowering plant in the family Asteraceae. It is native to South America (Argentina, Bolivia, Chile, Paraguay, Brazil, Uruguay) but has become naturalized in parts of North America, South Africa. and Taiwan. It is a common and widespread weed in the Southeast United States.

Atop the thin, naked stems are flower heads with small golden yellow ray florets, typically  in diameter.

Uses
Hypochaeris chillensis is used as medicinal plant in Brazil. The leaves and roots are edible either raw or cooked.

 In the state of Rio Grande do Sul, it is consumed raw as component of green salads.

Gallery

References

External links
photo of herbarium specimen at Missouri Botanical Garden, collected in Brazil in 1994

chillensis
Edible plants
Leaf vegetables
Herbs
Flora of South America
Plants described in 1818